The 1952 South Dakota State Jackrabbits football team was an American football team that represented South Dakota State University in the North Central Conference during the 1952 college football season. In its sixth season under head coach Ralph Ginn, the team compiled a 4–4–1 record and outscored opponents by a total of 287 to 230.

Schedule

References

South Dakota State
South Dakota State Jackrabbits football seasons
South Dakota State Jackrabbits football